The 2015–16 Danish 2nd Divisions will be the first with the league divided in three groups of eight teams in the autumn. In spring there will be a promotion play-off and a relegation play-off. The top three teams of the promotion play-off group will be promoted to the 2016–17 Danish 1st Division.

Participants

Group 1

League table

Group 2

League table

Group 3

League table

Promotion Group

League table 
The top 4 teams from each group will compete for 3 spots in the 2016–17 Danish 1st Division. The points and goals that the teams won in the autumn group against other participants in the promotion group was transferred to the promotion group.

Relegation Group
The bottom 4 teams from each group will compete to avoid the 2 relegations spots to the Denmark Series. The points and goals that the teams won in the autumn group against other participants in the relegation group was transferred to the relegation group.

League table

References

3
Danish 2nd Divisions
Danish 2nd Division seasons